Arya Vaisya may refer to:

 Moothan, a caste of traders in Kerala
 Arya Vaishya, a caste